Maria Vittoria dal Pozzo (Maria Vittoria Carlotta Enrichetta Giovanna; 9 August 1847 – 8 November 1876) was an Italian noblewoman and became the 6th Princess of Cisterna d'Asti and of Belriguardo after the death of her father. Married to Prince Amadeo of Savoy, Duke of Aosta, second son of King Victor Emmanuel. In 1870, her husband became the King of Spain, making her Queen consort of Spain.

Early life
She was the eldest and only surviving child of Carlo Emanuele dal Pozzo della Cisterna, 5th Prince of Cisterna d'Asti and of Belriguardo, and his wife, Countess Louise de Mérode-Westerloo. Upon the death of her father in 1864, she inherited his noble titles and thus became the Princess of Cisterna d'Asti and of Belriguardo, Marquise of Voghera and Countess of Ponderano, among other titles, in her own right.

Marriage
On 30 May 1867 in Turin, she married Prince Amadeo of Savoy, the Duke of Aosta and second son of King Victor Emmanuel II of Italy. An urban legend circulates that claims numerous tragedies to have befallen the wedding of Maria Vittoria and the Duke of Aosta.

Her husband was elected to occupy the vacant Spanish throne on 16 November 1870. She lived a discreet life in Spain and only involved herself in charity. Amadeo resigned from his position on 11 February 1873, and he and Maria Vittoria returned to Italy. Her health was damaged by the trip and childbirth, and she died later that year of tuberculosis in Sanremo.

Issue
 Prince Emanuele Filiberto of Savoy-Aosta, Duke of Aosta (13 January 1869 – 4 July 1931), Marshal of Italy, married to Princess Hélène of Orléans and had issue.
 Prince Vittorio Emanuele of Savoy-Aosta, Count of Turin (24 November 1870 – 10 October 1946), died unmarried.
 Prince Luigi Amedeo of Savoy-Aosta, Duke of the Abruzzi (29 January 1873 – 18 March 1933), Vice Admiral in the Italian Royal Navy, died unmarried.

Honours 
  :  Dame Grand Cross of the Order of Saints Maurice and Lazarus.
  :  Dame of the Order of the Starry Cross.

Ancestry

References 

|-

|-

1847 births
1876 deaths
19th-century Italian nobility
House of Pozzo
Princes della Cisterna
House of Savoy
Italian princesses
Duchesses of Aosta
Nobility from Paris
Burials at the Basilica of Superga
19th-century deaths from tuberculosis
Tuberculosis deaths in Italy
Knights Grand Cross of the Order of Saints Maurice and Lazarus
Dames of the Order of Saint Isabel
Infectious disease deaths in Liguria